Rhyssolobium is a genus of flowering plants of the family Apocynaceae , first described as a genus in 1838. It contains only one known species, Rhyssolobium dumosum, endemic to South Africa.

References

Monotypic Apocynaceae genera
Flora of South Africa
Asclepiadoideae